Love Myself may refer to:

 Love Myself (campaign), an anti-violence campaign launched by BTS and UNICEF
 "Love Myself" (Hailee Steinfeld song), 2015
 "Love Myself" (Tracee Ellis Ross song), 2020
 "Love Myself", a 2021 song by Andy Grammer
 "Love Myself", a 2017 song by Qveen Herby

See also
 "In Love with Myself", a  2005 song by David Guetta featuring JD Davis
 Love Yourself (disambiguation)